Indene is a flammable polycyclic hydrocarbon with chemical formula .  It is composed of a benzene ring fused with a cyclopentene ring.  This aromatic liquid is colorless although samples often are pale yellow.  The principal industrial use of indene is in the production of indene/coumarone thermoplastic resins. Substituted indenes and their closely related indane derivatives are important structural motifs found in many natural products and biologically active molecules, such as sulindac.

Isolation
Indene occurs naturally in coal-tar fractions boiling around 175–185 °C. It can be obtained by heating this fraction with sodium to precipitate solid "sodio-indene". This step exploits indene's weak acidity evidenced by its deprotonation by sodium to give the indenyl derivative.  The sodio-indene is converted back to indene by steam distillation.

Reactivity
Indene readily polymerises. Oxidation of indene with acid dichromate yields homophthalic acid (o-carboxylphenylacetic acid).  It condenses with diethyl oxalate in the presence of sodium ethoxide to form indene–oxalic ester, and with aldehydes or ketones in the presence of alkali to form benzofulvenes, which are highly coloured. Treatment of indene with organolithium reagents gives lithium indenyl compounds:
C9H8 + RLi -> LiC9H7 + RH
Indenyl is a ligand in organometallic chemistry, giving rise to many transition metal indenyl complexes.

See also 

 Indane
 Indole
 Isoindene
 Indenyl effect
 Indenone

References

External links